Tuticorin railway station is a train station connecting the city of Thoothukudi in the Indian state of Tamil Nadu. The station belongs to the Madurai railway division, a part of Southern Railway Zone.

Facilities 
The station has a computerised reservation center, ATMs, water vending machine, dormitories, cloak room and magazine kiosks. Also it has  pitline maintenance facility for cleaning and maintenance of rail coaches.

References

External links 
 

Madurai railway division
Railway stations in Thoothukudi district
Railway terminus in India